Trempealeau Mountain State Natural Area is a Wisconsin Department of Natural Resources-designated State Natural Area consisting of a 425-foot conical rock mound surrounded on three sides by the Mississippi and Trempealeau Rivers.  It is one of only 3 solid rock islands along the entire Mississippi River.

Location and access 

Access is via the Mississippi and Trempealeau Rivers.

Description 

Trempealeau Mountain is mostly wooded, dominated by black and white oak and basswood.  In a hollow on the southeast-facing side, red oaks are found mixed with patches of interrupted ferns.  On the cooler northeast-facing slopes, sugar maple and basswood dominate. The dry south-facing slopes contain small patches of dry prairie with big blue-stem, needle grass, side-oats grama, hairy grama, white and purple prairie-clover, prairie larkspur, and partridge pea. Numerous Native American mounds, burial sites, and habitation sites make this a rich archeological site. French explorers were among the first Europeans to explore the area and the name Trempealeau comes from the French, “la montagne qui trempe à l’eau” meaning “the mountain whose foot is bathed in water”.

References

External links 
http://dnr.wi.gov/topic/Lands/naturalareas/index.asp?SNA=356 WI DNR
http://dnr.wi.gov/topic/lands/naturalareas/documents/topomaps/map356.pdf

State Natural Areas of Wisconsin